The Indian River is a river in Muskoka Lakes, Muskoka District in Central Ontario, Canada. It is in the Great Lakes Basin, and connects Lake Rosseau (upstream) with Lake Muskoka (downstream).

The river exits Lake Rosseau at Port Carling Dam, flows through the Forman Narrows into Mirror Lake, and reaches its mouth at Lake Muskoka off Hanna Point. The river was made navigable by the erection of the dam and creation of locks in 1871. This allowed steamships to pass between the two lakes and spurred the development of recreational resorts on Lake Rosseau, and on Lake Joseph further upstream.

See also
List of rivers of Ontario

References

Sources

Rivers of Muskoka District
Rivers of Nipissing District